NGC 7429 is an open cluster in the constellation Cepheus. The object was discovered on 29 September 1829 by the British astronomer John Herschel.

References

External links 
 

Open clusters
7429
Cepheus (constellation)